Uta Frommater (born 12 December 1948 in Oldenburg) is a German former swimmer who competed in the 1968 Summer Olympics.

References

1948 births
Living people
German female swimmers
German female breaststroke swimmers
Olympic swimmers of West Germany
Swimmers at the 1968 Summer Olympics
Olympic bronze medalists for West Germany
Olympic bronze medalists in swimming
European Aquatics Championships medalists in swimming
Medalists at the 1968 Summer Olympics
Sportspeople from Oldenburg